Xincheng Station is a railway station of the Taiwan Railways Administration North-link line located in Xincheng Township, Hualien County, Taiwan. To promote the sight-seeing in nearby area, the local committees decided to change the station name to Taroko according to the famous Taroko Gorge. The new name was effective from August 2007. But during the transition period, most of the signs contain both name versions of the station to avoid ambiguity.

Around the station
 Taroko National Park

See also
 List of railway stations in Taiwan

References

External links

1975 establishments in Taiwan
Railway stations in Hualien County
Railway stations opened in 1975
Railway stations served by Taiwan Railways Administration